Eumaiochoerus is an extinct genus of even-toed ungulates that existed during the Miocene in Italy.

Description
Eumaiochoerus had a short snout, spatulate upper incisors and small, chisel-shaped lower tusks.

Fossils of Eumaiochoerus were found in Baccinello and Montebamboli in Italy, which at the time of its existence would have been an island chain. Eumaiochoerus does show characteristics of an insular mammal, being much smaller in size than its mainland relative Microstonyx.

See also
Oreopithecus

References

Prehistoric Suidae
Miocene mammals of Europe
Miocene even-toed ungulates
Prehistoric even-toed ungulate genera